Agent Dossiers is a 1983 role-playing game supplement published by TSR, Inc. for Top Secret.

Contents
Agent Dossiers are a set of sixteen 8 1/4" x 10 1/4" character sheets for Top Secret.

Reception
Nick Davison reviewed Agent Dossiers for Imagine magazine, and stated that "Not a vital aid to playing the Top Secret game, but certainly a great deal tidier."

Kevin Allen reviewed Top Secret Agent Dossiers in Space Gamer No. 70. Allen commented that "Overall, the new Agent Dossier is an improvement over the old one [...] If you don't mind the cost, though, it's a good buy . . . and if you've played Top Secret for long, like me, you need a new character sheet."

References

Character sheets
Role-playing game supplements introduced in 1983
Top Secret (role-playing game)